Caramelos de Cianuro is the fifth studio album from the Venezuelan Latin rock band Caramelos de Cianuro.

Members
 Asier Cazalís (Vocalist)
 Alfonso Tosta (Drummer)
 Pável Tello (Bassist)
 Miguel González "El Enano" (Guitarist)

Track listing
 Verano
 Infierno VIP
 Rubia Sol Morena Luna
 Estrógeno
 La Casa
 2 Caras 2 Corazones
 Yo No Quiero Más Calor
 Adiós Amor
 La Carretera
 Un Poco Solo
 Lobby

2010 albums
Rock en Español albums
Caramelos de Cianuro albums

es:Caramelos de Cianuro